Strangers is a British television crime drama series, principally written and created by Murray Smith, and first broadcast on ITV on 5 June 1978. The series, featuring the characters of Detective Sergeant George Bulman (Don Henderson) and his assistant Detective Constable Derek Willis (Dennis Blanch), was a spin-off from the 1976 TV series The XYY Man, adapted from the novels of Kenneth Royce. The series was first suggested by Granada Television executives, who in 1977, outlined their plan to devise a new series to feature the regular characters of Bulman and Willis.

"... I was sent here to be a stranger in town, a face they didn't recognise ..." - George Bulman

The series began life as a fairly standard police drama, with Bulman positioned as its eccentric lead. The series' premise centred around a group of police officers, including Bulman and Willis, known as 'Unit 23', who are brought together from different parts of the country to Manchester to infiltrate areas and investigate crimes that familiar local detectives could not. Five series were broadcast, with the final episode airing on 20 October 1982.

All five series of Strangers were released on DVD via the Network imprint as a complete box-set on 19 October 2009.

Following the series, a further spin-off, simply entitled Bulman, ran for two series on ITV. It follows Bulman, again played by Don Henderson, as he retires from the police and becomes a private detective.

Characters
Initially Unit 23 consisted of Bulman, Willis and WDC Linda Doran (Frances Tomelty). Local liaison was provided by Detective Sergeant David Singer (John Ronane), while their superior officer was Detective Chief Inspector Rainbow (David Hargreaves). In the early years few episodes featured all five of these characters, most using just two or three of the regulars. The second series, shown in early 1979, introduced WDC Vanessa Bennett, played by Fiona Mollison, who replaced Frances Tomelty. David Hargreaves also departed the show following this series.

For the third series Bulman, Willis, Bennett and the newly promoted Detective Inspector Singer became members of the Inter City Squad under the command of Detective Chief Superintendent Jack Lambie (Mark McManus). The basic premise was similar, but rather than covering just the Northwest of England the squad's remit extended to the whole country. By the fourth series Bulman had also gained promotion to Detective Chief Inspector. This series also reintroduced the semi-regular character William Dugdale (Thorley Walters), a member of the British Foreign Office and the Secret Intelligence Service, who became involved when there was a political or intelligence aspect to an investigation.

Production
The first series was shot primarily on videotape, with only location footage being shot on film. The second series featured more use on film: the opening episode, "The Wheeler Dealers", was shot entirely on film and the final episode, "Marriages, Deaths and Births", was shot entirely on film except for the title sequence and a small number of scenes at the police station. From the third series onwards the entire production moved to 16mm film.

The first series was scripted by a number of writers, and only Leslie Duxbury wrote more than one episode. He contributed one further script, for the second series. During series two the series creator, Murray Smith, became the principal writer, and he wrote all but six of the remaining twenty-five episodes.

Cast
 Don Henderson as DS/DCI George Bulman
 Dennis Blanch as DC/DS Derek Willis
 Frances Tomelty as WDC Linda Doran (Series 1—2)
 John Ronane as DS/DI David Singer (Series 1—4)
 David Hargreaves as DCI Rainbow (Series 1—2)
 Fiona Mollison as WDC Vanessa Bennett (Series 2—5)
 Mark McManus as DCS Jack Lambie (Series 3—5)
 Bruce Bould as DI Tom Casey (Series 3)
 Thorley Walters as William Dugdale (Series 3—5)

Episodes

Series 1 (1978)

Series 2 (1979)

Series 3 (1980)

Series 4 (1981)

Series 5 (1982)

References

External links
 

ITV television dramas
British thriller television series
Television shows based on British novels
British television spin-offs
1978 British television series debuts
1982 British television series endings
1970s British drama television series
1980s British drama television series
British detective television series
Television series by ITV Studios
English-language television shows
Television shows produced by Granada Television